To be as "mad as a March hare" is an English idiomatic phrase derived from the observed antics, said to occur only in the March breeding season of the European hare (Lepus europaeus). The phrase is an allusion that can be used to refer to any other animal or human who behaves in the excitable and unpredictable manner of a March hare.

Historical development of the idiom

A long-held view is that the hare will behave strangely and excitedly throughout its breeding season, which in Europe peaks in the month of March. This odd behaviour includes boxing at other hares, jumping vertically for seemingly no reason and generally displaying abnormal behaviour. An early verbal record of this animal's strange behaviour occurred in about 1500, in the poem Blowbol's Test where the original poet said:
e
(Then they begin to swerve and to stare, And be as brainless as a March hare)

Similar phrases are attested in the sixteenth century in the works of John Skelton (Replycacion, 1528: "Aiii, I saye, thou madde Marche Hare"; Magnyfycence, 1529: "As mery as a marche hare"). A later recorded use of the phrase occurs in the writings of Sir Thomas More (: "."

Although the phrase in general has been in continuous use since the 16th century, it was popularised in more recent times by Lewis Carroll in his 1865 children's book Alice's Adventures in Wonderland, in which the March Hare is a character.

See also
The Daily Telegraph Affair of 1908, during which Wilhelm II of Germany referred to the English as being "mad as March hares".
Hare
Mad as a hatter
March Hare
March Hare (festival)

References

External links

BBC Nature page with videos
Boxing hares videos

English-language idioms
Metaphors referring to animals
16th-century neologisms